General population may refer to:

 In prison organization, the general population refers to the group of inmates who are not given any specific treatment
 In epidemiology, the general population refers to all individuals without reference to any specific characteristic
 General Population (album), a 1997 album by C-Block
 General Population (Mauritius)